Robin Jeanne DiAngelo (née Taylor; born September 8, 1956) is an American author working in the fields of critical discourse analysis and whiteness studies. She formerly served as a tenured professor of multicultural education at Westfield State University and is currently an affiliate associate professor of education at the University of Washington. She is known for her work pertaining to "white fragility", an expression she coined in 2011 and explored further in a 2018 book entitled White Fragility: Why It's So Hard for White People to Talk About Racism.

Early life 
DiAngelo was born Robin Jeanne Taylor into a working-class family in San Jose, California, the youngest of three daughters born to Robert Z. Taylor and Maryanne Jeanne DiAngelo. 

She lived with her mother in poverty until her death from cancer, after which she and her siblings lived with her father. She had a child in her mid-20s, becoming a single mother. She worked as a waitress before beginning college at the age of 30.

In her youth, she saw that her poverty led to class oppression, though it was only later in life that she identified personally benefiting from white privilege, even while being "poor and white". In 2018, DiAngelo stated that her "experience of poverty would have been different had [she] not been white".

Education and career
DiAngelo earned a B.A. with a double major in sociology and history from Seattle University in 1991, where she  graduated summa cum laude and was the class valedictorian.

DiAngelo received her Ph.D. in multicultural education from the University of Washington in 2004, with a dissertation entitled "Whiteness in racial dialogue: a discourse analysis". Her Ph.D. committee was chaired by James A. Banks.
In 2007, she joined the faculty of Westfield State University, where she was named an associate professor of multicultural education in 2014. She resigned from her position at Westfield in 2015. She now holds the position of affiliate associate professor of education at the University of Washington. She was granted two honorary doctoral degrees from Starr King Seminary (2019) and Lewis & Clark College (2017). 

DiAngelo has worked for over 20 years providing racial justice training for schools, non-profits, universities and businesses. She argues that racism is embedded throughout American political systems and culture. In a 2019 article for The New Yorker, the columnist Kelefa Sanneh characterized DiAngelo as "perhaps the country's most visible expert in anti-bias training, a practice that is also an industry, and from all appearances a prospering one".

Works
DiAngelo has published a number of academic articles on race, privilege, and education and written several books. 

In 2011, she co-wrote with Ozlem Sensoy, Is Everyone Really Equal? An Introduction to Key Concepts in Critical Social Justice Education. The book won the American Educational Research Association's Critics' Choice Book Award (2012) and the Society of Professors of Education Book Award (2018).

That year, DiAngelo published a paper titled "White Fragility" in The International Journal of Critical Pedagogy, thereby coining the term. She has defined the concept of white fragility as "a state in which even a minimum amount of racial stress becomes intolerable, triggering a range of defensive moves". In the paper, she wrote:White people in the U.S. and other white settler colonialist societies live in a racially insular social environment. This insulation builds our expectations for racial comfort while at the same time lowering our stamina for enduring racial stress. I term this lack of racial stamina White Fragility. White Fragility is a state in which even a minimal challenge to the white position becomes intolerable, triggering a range of defensive moves including: argumentation, invalidation, silence, withdrawal and claims of being attacked and misunderstood. These moves function to reinstate white racial equilibrium and maintain control.Since 2016, DiAngelo has regularly led workshops on the topic. In 2017, the term "white fragility" was shortlisted by the Oxford Dictionary for Word of the Year.

In June 2018, DiAngelo published the book White Fragility: Why It's So Hard for White People to Talk About Racism. The book debuted on the New York Times bestseller list and remained on the list for 155 weeks. It has been translated into eleven languages, including French, Italian, German, Japanese, Dutch and Portuguese. 

In June 2020, during the George Floyd protests, White Fragility reached number one on the New York Times list. The July 26, 2020 edition of the list marked the book's 97th week in the Paperback Nonfiction category, where it was ranked number one. The book received mixed critical reception, with positive reviews in sources including New Statesman, The New Yorker, Publishers Weekly, and the Los Angeles Review of Books, and negative reviews in sources including The Atlantic and The Washington Post. Publishers Weekly praised the book as "a thoughtful, instructive, and comprehensive book on challenging racism." Isaac Chotiner, in The New Yorker, said that in the wake of the Murder of George Floyd and the rise of the Black Lives Matter movement, DiAngelo's book served as a guide for many of the millions of Americans questioning systematic racism, though he notes that some critics have described her definition of white fragility as broad, reductive, and condescending towards people of color.

By 2020, DiAngelo became a leading figure in the field and industry of "antiracism training." Scholars dispute whether antiracism training achieves its intended purpose and whether in some cases could backfire. According to Harvard University sociologist Frank Dobbin, there is no evidence to indicate that anti-bias training leads to increases in the number of women or people of color in management positions. A 2009 Annual Review of Psychology study concluded, "We currently do not know whether a wide range of programs and policies tend to work on average," with the authors of the study stating in 2020 that as the quality of studies increases, the effect size of anti-bias training dwindles.

In February 2021, an online training course bearing her name came under scrutiny after a major social media backlash against The Coca-Cola Company, following the leak of pictures showing parts of an employee webinar. The course, called "Confronting Racism" and offered on the LinkedIn Learning platform, attracted negative publicity concerning DiAngelo's claim that "To be less white is to: be less oppressive, less arrogant, less certain, less defensive, less ignorant, more humble". It also showed DiAngelo asking viewers to "break with white solidarity". A Coca-Cola spokesperson later stated that the course was not a compulsory part of their employee training program, and specified that it is "not the focus of the company's curriculum," adding that the course was "part of a learning plan to help build an inclusive workplace". The course was swiftly removed from the LinkedIn Learning and the Microsoft Learning platforms. According to DiAngelo, the clips containing her advice to "be less white" came from a 2018 interview conducted with a different company and were being used by Coca-Cola alongside other materials without her knowledge or approval.

In June 2021, DiAngelo published Nice Racism: How Progressive White People Perpetuate Racial Harm. It is a continuation of White Fragility.

Bibliography

References

External links

 

American anti-racism activists
White culture scholars
American educational theorists
American education writers
American women academics
American women non-fiction writers
21st-century American women writers
21st-century American non-fiction writers
Westfield State University faculty
University of Washington faculty
University of Washington College of Education alumni
Writers from San Jose, California
American writers of Italian descent
1956 births
Living people
American segregationists